Labena is a genus of ichneumon wasps in the family Ichneumonidae. There are at least 40 described species in Labena.

Species
These 42 species belong to the genus Labena:

 Labena annulata (Brulle, 1846) c
 Labena canelensis Porter, 2005 c g
 Labena chadwickii (Parrott, 1955) c g
 Labena delta Gauld, 2000 c g
 Labena eremica Gauld, 2000 c g
 Labena espinita Gauld, 2000 c g
 Labena fiorii Graf & Marzagao, 1999 c g
 Labena flavatoria (Fabricius, 1804) c g
 Labena gloriosa Cresson, 1874 c g
 Labena grallator (Say, 1835) c g b
 Labena grandis Gauld & Holloway, 1986 c g
 Labena guanacasteca Gauld, 2000 c g
 Labena humida Gauld, 2000 c g
 Labena jacunda Gauld & Holloway, 1986 c g
 Labena keira Gauld & Holloway, 1986 c g
 Labena lachryma Gauld, 2000 c g
 Labena littoralis González-Moreno & Bordera, 2015 g
 Labena madoricola Gonzalez-Moreno & Bordera, 2015 g
 Labena malecasta Gauld & Holloway, 1986 c g
 Labena marginata Szepligeti, 1914 c g
 Labena mimica Gauld, 2000 c g
 Labena moragai Gauld, 2000 c g
 Labena morda Gauld, 2000 c g
 Labena nigra Rohwer, 1920 c g
 Labena obscura Gauld, 2000 c g
 Labena ogra Gauld, 2000 c g
 Labena osai Gauld, 2000 c g
 Labena petita Gauld, 2000 c g
 Labena pluvia Gauld, 2000 c g
 Labena polemica Gauld, 2000 c g
 Labena pucon Porter, 2005 c g
 Labena pudenda Gauld & Holloway, 1986 c g
 Labena rufa (Brulle, 1846) c
 Labena schausi Cushman, 1922 c g
 Labena sericea (Kriechbaumer, 1890) c g
 Labena striata Townes, 1966 c g
 Labena tarsata Gauld, 2000 c g
 Labena tekalina Gonzalez-Moreno & Bordera, 2015 g
 Labena tinctipennis Rohwer, 1920 c g b
 Labena trilineata Ashmead, 1895 c g
 Labena variegata Szepligeti, 1914 c g
 Labena zerita Gauld, 2000 c g

Data sources: i = ITIS, c = Catalogue of Life, g = GBIF, b = Bugguide.net

References

Further reading

External links

 

Parasitic wasps